Elekeiroz is a Brazilian chemical  company of production of input and intermediate chemicals for industrial purposes in the building and construction, footwear, clothing, automotive, food and various chemical industries, among others, as well as agribusiness.

Elekeiroz produces unsaturated polyester resins, formaldehyde, formaldehyde-urea concentrate, sulfuric acid, oxo derivatives (n-Butanol, Isobutanol, 2-Ethylhexanol and 2-Ethylhexanoic acid), phthalic and maleic anhydrides and plasticizers.

The operations are based on two sites, one located in Camaçari, Bahia, at Brazil's largest petrochemical complex, and one in Várzea Paulista, São Paulo.

Elekeiroz was bought by HIG capital in 2018

References

Chemical companies of Brazil
Petrochemical companies
Companies based in São Paulo (state)
Itaúsa
Chemical companies established in 1894
Non-renewable resource companies established in 1894
1894 establishments in Brazil
Companies listed on B3 (stock exchange)